Parrossaz is a mountain of Savoie and Haute-Savoie, France. It lies in the Aravis range. It has an elevation of 2,556 metres above sea level.

Mountains of the Alps
Mountains of Savoie
Mountains of Haute-Savoie